Bangabandhu Sheikh Mujibur Rahman University, Kishoreganj is a government financed public university located in the town of Kishoreganj in Bangladesh. Established in 2020, BSMRU is named after Bangabandhu Sheikh Mujibur Rahman, the country's founding father. On 24 January 2020 in regular cabinet meeting, chaired by prime minister, agreed in principle to the Acts for the Bangabandhu Sheikh Mujibur Rahman University in Kishoreganj District. Dr Z M Parvez Sazzad, a professor at the Department of Electrical & Electronics Engineering (EEE) in Dhaka University, will serve as the founding vice-chancellor of the Bangabandhu Sheikh Mujibur Rahman University in Kishorganj for the next four years starting from 27 January 2021.

About BSMRU

BSMRU offers undergraduate and postgraduate programs in a range of disciplines, including business administration, english, engineering, and science. The university has seven faculties and more than thirty departments.

In addition to its academic programs, BSMRU will also be involved in community outreach and development activities. The university will have number of programs and initiatives that will support the local community, including providing access to education, healthcare, and other services.

BSMRU is located on a campus of over 100 acres, and it is expected to have a number of facilities for students, including a library, a gymnasium, and a number of sports grounds. The university will also have a number of student clubs and organizations, which will provide opportunities for students to get involved in extracurricular activities and develop their skills outside of the classroom.

Campus life at BSMRU is vibrant and diverse, with a range of activities and events for students to get involved in. The university hosts regular cultural events, sports competitions, and other activities, which provide opportunities for students to socialize and have fun.

The university's library is a popular destination for students, with a massive collection of books and other resources. The library also provides access to a number of online databases and research tools, which students can use to support their studies.

Overall, Bangabandhu Sheikh Mujibur Rahman University is a leading institution of higher education in Bangladesh, known for its commitment to excellence in teaching and research. The university is set to begin its academic activities on 2023, and it is expected to continue to play a key role in the country's higher education sector.

Academics

Faculties

Faculty of Arts
 Department of Bangla (proposed)
 Department of English
 Department of Philosophy and Ethics (proposed)
 Department of History (proposed)
 Department of Law (proposed)
 Department of Fine Arts (proposed)
 Department of Music and Theater Studies (proposed)

Faculty of Science
 Department of Mathematics
 Department of Physics and Astronomy (proposed)
 Department of Chemistry (proposed)
 Department of Statistics and Data Science (proposed)
 Department of Geography and Water Resource Management (proposed)

Faculty of Social Science
 Department of Political Science and Bangladesh Studies (proposed)
 Department of Social Work (proposed)
 Department of Economics (proposed)
 Department of Population Science (proposed)
 Department of International Relations (proposed)
 Department of Sociology and Anthropology (proposed)

Faculty of Business Studies
 Department of Accounting
 Department of Management (proposed)
 Department of Marketing (proposed)
 Department of Finance (proposed)

Faculty of Biological Science
 Department of Molecular Biology and Genetic Engineering (proposed)
 Department of Pharmacy (proposed)
 Department of Biochemistry and Microbiology (proposed)
 Department of Fisheries and Aquaculture (proposed)
 Department of Botany and Plant Biology (proposed)
 Department of Zoology (proposed)
 Department of Environment and Ecology (proposed)
 Department of Marine Science and Blue Economy (proposed)
 Department of Food Science and Technology (proposed)
 Department of Public Health (proposed)

Faculty of Engineering
 Department of Electrical and Electronic Engineering (proposed)
 Department of Computer Science and Engineering
 Department of Civil and Environment Engineering (proposed)
 Department of Materials Science and Engineering (proposed)
 Department of Biomedical Engineering (proposed)
 Department of Chemical Engineering (proposed)
 Department of Mechanical and Production Engineering (proposed)
 Department of Nuclear Science and Engineering (proposed)

Institues
 Institute of Intelligent Systems for Automation
 Institute of Information Technology and Communication System Development
 Institute of Environment and Sustainable Development
 Institute of Supply Chain Management

Centers
 Centre for Skill Development
 Centre for Bangladesh and South Asia Studies
 Centre for Waste Management

Research

Research centers
 Centre for Nanoscience and Engineering (CNE)
 Centre for Biosystems Science and Engineering (CBSSE)
 Centre for Communications, Networking, Signal and Image Processing (CcNSIP)
 Centre for Infrastructure, Sustainable Transportation and Urban Planning (CiSTUP)
 Centre for Interdisciplinary Mathematical Sciences (CeIMS)
 Centre for Society and Policy (CSP)
 Centre for Energy Research (CER)

References

External links
 University Grants Commission of Bangladesh
 Bangladesh Bureau of Educational Information and Statistics

Public engineering universities of Bangladesh
Public universities of Bangladesh
Netrokona District